This is a list of games that are part of the Classic NES Series in North America,  in Japan, and NES Classics in Europe and Australia. The series consists of emulated Nintendo Entertainment System, Family Computer, and Family Computer Disk System games for the Game Boy Advance.

A special edition Game Boy Advance SP that has a similar color pattern to an NES controller (along with a Famicom counterpart in Japan), was released to go along with these games. In Japan, the color of the cartridges often matches the color of their original Famicom cartridges, but in North America, all the games in this series were released in a light gray cartridges made to resemble the default color of NES cartridges.

List
All of the games were published by Nintendo.

Nintendo
A total of 18 first-party games were released in the series. Of these, six were previously released by alternative means on the Game Boy Advance:
 Animal Crossing for the GameCube featured an Advance Play mode, allowing NES games to be played on a Game Boy Advance by using a GameCube – Game Boy Advance link cable. Two other games feature a yellow check mark, as they do not support Advance Play.
 The e-Reader accessory featured a NES emulator for the Game Boy Advance, allowing NES games to be played after scanning the corresponding cards.

Third party

Reception 
The series of reissues had a mixed reception. Jeff Gerstmann of GameSpot complained that a Bomberman without multiplayer is "hardly a Bomberman at all." Metroids inclusion in the series was considered redundant by Bob Colayco of GameSpot, since it was already included as an unlockable extra in the remake Metroid: Zero Mission as well as in Metroid Prime.

Some reviewers were annoyed that the Classic NES Series versions of some games differed slightly from the originals. For example, Craig Harris of IGN complained that the Classic NES Series version of Xevious had an automatic firing setting that made it less difficult than the original.  Reviewers also complained about the lack of the pie/cement level in Donkey Kong.  In Super Mario Bros., the screen ratio aspect was altered, causing odd graphical artifacts.

The prices of the Classic NES Series and previous rereleases were also criticized. Many reviewers noted that $20 was a high price for one game.  Both GameSpot and IGN noted that Nintendo had given away The Legend of Zelda and Zelda II: The Adventure of Link for free in the Collector's Edition bonus disc, although they conceded that the Classic NES Series version was portable.  However, reviewers consistently hailed Super Mario Bros., The Legend of Zelda, Castlevania, Zelda II: The Adventure of Link and Dr. Mario  as being worth the cost of the cartridge.

References

External links 
NES Classics for Game Boy Advance
Famicom Mini series 1
Famicom Mini series 2
Famicom Mini (Disk System) series 3

Game Boy Advance games
Nintendo Entertainment System